David Ibiyeomie is a Nigerian pastor, author, televangelist and the founder/presiding pastor of Salvation Ministries with its headquarters located in Port Harcourt, Rivers State, Nigeria.

Early life 
On October 21, 1962, David Ibiyeomie was born in Bonny Island, Rivers State, Nigeria. He is a native of Bolo Town in Ogu/Bolo Local Government Area of Rivers state.

Education
David Ibiyeomie attended Banham Primary School and Government Comprehensive Secondary School Borikiri, all in Rivers State for his primary and secondary education. In 1980, he enrolled into the University of Science and Technology, Port Harcourt.

Training 
In 1995 Ibiyeomie enrolled into full time Bible School in the Word of Faith Bible Institute, an arm of David Oyedepo’s Ministry. Ibiyeomie started Salvation Ministries on Sunday April 13, 1997 with 34 persons in attendance.

Career
After completing his Bible School training at Bishop David Oyedepo's Word of Faith Bible Institute (WOFBI), Ibiyeomie started a house fellowship with his family in Victoria Island, Lagos; he later moved to Port Harcourt, Rivers State, where he started Salvation Ministries (Glorious Chapel) on April 13, 1997, with a little over twenty members in attendance.

In July 1997, the church relocated to a larger plot of land. As of 2017, Salvation Ministries averages about 50,000 attendees every Sunday at its headquarters. In February 2011, Salvation Ministries started 14 satellite churches in one day, with all running five services each.

Ministry 
Through his television ministry Hour of Salvation and live services, David Ibiyeomie reaches millions of worshippers. The Hour of Salvation TV programme started on NTA channel 10 Port Harcourt, Rivers State, Nigeria in 2001 and currently runs on over 40 television stations both locally and internationally. He is an author and hosts an internet radio show. 

In 2010, he began construction of a 120,000 seat temple.

Controversies
Ibiyeomie has been controversial on multiple occasions. In January 2017, Ibiyeomie was alleged to have made prejudiced comments against the Ogoni people, leading the Movement for the Survival of the Ogoni People to demand that he apologise.

In March 2017, journalist Kemi Omololu-Olunloyo alleged that Ibiyeomie was having an affair with Nollywood actress Iyabo Ojo. Olunloyo was subsequently arrested and refused bail for defamation. However she has been released. Ibiyeomie strongly denied the allegations.

See also

 List of people from Rivers State
 List of pastors in Nigeria

References

1962 births
Living people
People from Bonny
Nigerian Christian clergy
Rivers State University alumni
Nigerian Pentecostal pastors
Nigerian television evangelists